The 1964–65 Albanian National Championship was the 27th season of the Albanian National Championship since its establishment in 1930.

Overview
It was contested by 12 teams, and 17 Nëntori won the championship.

League table

Note: '17 Nëntori' is Tirana, 'Lokomotiva Durrës' is Teuta, 'Traktori' is Lushnja, 'Labinoti' is Elbasani, 'Ylli i Kuq' is Pogradeci

Results

Relegation/promotion playoff

References
Albania - List of final tables (RSSSF)

Kategoria Superiore seasons
1
Albania